Vivid (stylized as VIVID) is the second extended play (EP) by South Korean boy band AB6IX. The album was released digitally and physically on June 29, 2020, by Brand New Music. Vivid contains six tracks with "The Answer" serving as its lead single. It marks the group's first comeback as a four member-group.

The EP was originally set to be released on June 8, 2020, but was delayed to June 29, 2020, due to member Youngmin's departure from the group on June 8, 2020. Youngmin's departure resulted in the group having to re-record the songs on the EP without Youngmin's voice.

Commercial performance 
Vivid reached 93,000 physical album sales within a week and has broken the group's previous first week of release sales record on the 5th day of the release.

Track listing 
Credits adapted from Melon

Charts

Weekly charts

Monthly charts

Sales

Awards

Music programs

Release history

References 

2020 EPs
AB6IX albums
Korean-language EPs
K-pop EPs